Hasan Khan Darrehsi (also Romanized as Ḩasan Khan Darrehsī) is a village in Qeshlaq-e Jonubi Rural District, Qeshlaq Dasht District, Bileh Savar County, Ardabil Province, Iran. At the 2006 census, its population was 122, in 25 families.

References 

Towns and villages in Bileh Savar County